Central Park Station may refer to:

Central Park Station (Incheon), South Korea
Central Park Station (Kaohsiung MRT), Taiwan
Central Park tram stop, Manchester, UK
Central Park station (CTA), Chicago, USA
Central Park station (Chongqing Rail Transit), Chongqing, China
Central Park Station (Suzhou), Suzhou, China
Central Park station (RTD) in Denver, Colorado, USA